The yellow-throated spadebill (Platyrinchus flavigularis) is a species of bird in the family Tyrannidae.  It is found in Colombia, Ecuador, Peru, and Venezuela.  Its natural habitat is subtropical or tropical moist montane forests.

References

yellow-throated spadebill
Birds of the Northern Andes
yellow-throated spadebill
yellow-throated spadebill
Taxonomy articles created by Polbot